OCN is a three letter abbreviation that stands for:

OCLC Control Number, a bibliographic record identifier
In Oncology nursing, an Oncology Certified Nurse
Opaskwayak Cree Nation
Open College Network, a UK education organisation today known as NOCN
Open Computer Network, a major Internet Service Provider in Japan
Orange County Newschannel, a defunct cable television news network targeted toward Orange County, California
Original Camera Negative, the film stock used in a movie camera
Orion Cinema Network, a Korean cinema network by On-Media
Orthodox Christian Network
Originally called number, in telephony, the phone number of the originally called party, regardless of call redirection; look inside a Signalling System No. 7 (SS7) ISDN User Part (IUP) initial address message (IAM) for this optional parameter
Operating Company Number, in telephony, a code used in various iconectiv telephony products, a major subset of which equate to Company Codes assigned by the National Exchange Carrier Association (NECA) to telecommunications carriers (including landline, wireless carriers, and resellers of various types).
Order confirmation number, a method for recording purchase orders in many Enterprise resource planning (ERP) systems

OCN may also refer to:

The chemical formula for a cyanate ion
The NYSE Symbol for Ocwen Financial Corporation
The IATA airport code for Oceanside Municipal Airport